The A. C. Trumbo House is a house in Muskogee, Oklahoma, United States. It was built in 1906 for Arthur C. Trumbo as a replica of one of Mark Twain's houses and is on the National Register of Historic Places. The plot on which it stands was originally in the Creek Nation, Indian territory, before it was incorporated into Oklahoma on November 16, 1907.

NRHP Application discussion
This was one of five historic residences that were nominated in a group, titled "Territorial Homes of Muskogee." The houses in this group include:
A. C. Trumbo House,
J.C. Welch House,
A. W. Patterson Home,
Coss Home, and
Murphy Home.
All of these houses were built in the same time period (1904-1907), shortly before the end of the Territorial Period. They are all in good condition and continue in service as residences. There have been no alterations significant enough to disturb their historic character.

Text of the badly faded sign reads: "This home, at 1321 West Broadway, built in 1906 by A.C. Trumbo, is a replica of one of Mark Twain's homes.  Mr. Trumbo was the son-in-law of A.W. Patterson, and both men were pioneer bankers and promoters of Muskogee and early Arkansas River navigation.  Together these two men provided the financing for Muskogee's Convention Hall, scene of the Trans-Mississippi Congress of 1907."

Historical significance of A. C. Trumbo 
Trumbo and Patterson had co-founded the Bank of Muskogee in 1901, before Oklahoma became a state. At the time the Trumbo house was built, Muskogee was within the Creek Nation in Indian Territory. It was the most populous and most commercially important city in the Territory. The two men provided financing for Muskogee's Convention Hall, which was built in 1907 to house the Trans-Mississippi Commercial Convention. Trumbo succeeded Patterson as president of Bank of Muskogee in 1918.

Description
The A.C. Trumbo House  was built in 1906, based on the design of a house belonging to Samuel Clemens (Mark Twain) that Mr. and Mrs. Trumbo visited during their honeymoon. The architecture includes elements of the Prairie style, such as:
 a central portion that rises slightly above the flanking wings,
 eaves extending well beyond the walls to create a horizontal quality,
 brick and stucco extending walls that delineate the entrance and rear terrace,
 leaded glass sidelights that flank the entry door,
 a floriated stained glass window serving as the focal point of the facade.

Notes

External links 
Historic Homes of Muskogee Oklahoma

References

Buildings and structures in Muskogee, Oklahoma
Houses on the National Register of Historic Places in Oklahoma
Houses in Muskogee County, Oklahoma
National Register of Historic Places in Muskogee County, Oklahoma
Houses completed in 1906
1906 establishments in Indian Territory